Kothacheruvu is a village in Sri Sathya Sai district of the Indian state of Andhra Pradesh. It is the headquarters of Kothacheruvu mandal in Puttaparthi revenue division.

References 

Villages in Sri Sathya Sai district
Mandal headquarters in Sri Sathya Sai district